A.P. Williams Funeral Home is a historic African-American funeral home located at Columbia, South Carolina. It was built between 1893 and 1911 as a single-family residence, and is a two-story frame building with a hipped roof with gables and a columned porch. At that time, it was one of six funeral homes that served black customers. Archie Preston Williams, II was a leader in the city's black community.

It was added to the National Register of Historic Places in 2005.

References

African-American history of South Carolina
Death care companies of the United States
Houses on the National Register of Historic Places in South Carolina
Houses completed in 1911
Houses in Columbia, South Carolina
National Register of Historic Places in Columbia, South Carolina